The 1982 Vermont gubernatorial election took place on November 2, 1982. Incumbent Republican Richard A. Snelling ran successfully for a fourth term as Governor of Vermont, defeating Democratic candidate Madeleine Kunin.

Republican primary

Results

Democratic primary

Results

Liberty Union primary

Results

Citizens primary

Results

General election

Results

References

Vermont
1982
Gubernatorial